Evensong is a 1934 British musical film directed by Victor Saville and starring Evelyn Laye, Fritz Kortner and Emlyn Williams. It is loosely based on the story of the singer Nellie Melba. It was also the first film of Alec Guinness, who appears as an uncredited extra.

It was shot the Lime Grove Studios. The film's sets were designed by the art director Alfred Junge.

Cast
 Evelyn Laye as Madame Irela 
 Fritz Kortner as Arthur Kober 
 Emlyn Williams as George Leary 
 Carl Esmond as Count Ehrenburg/Archduke Theodore 
 Alice Delysia as Madame Valmond 
 Conchita Supervia as Baba L'Etoile 
 Muriel Aked as Tremlowe 
 Dennis Val Norton as Sovino 
 Arthur Sinclair as Pa O'Neil
 Patrick O'Moore as Bob O'Neil 
 Browning Mummery as solo tenor/Alfredo the Gondolier 
 Frederick Leister as Emperor Franz Josef
 George Treger as Solo Gypsy Violinist
 Alec Guinness as Soldier (uncredited)

Critical reception
The New York Times found the film "politely dull in its reverent examination of a songbird's career. But in its sober way it emerges as a superior musical entertainment...Victor Saville tells the story with tenderness, intelligence and skill and his method is technically invigorating in one lengthy sequence which he develops through the use of musical pantomime" ; while Allmovie noted "Evelyn Laye made only a handful of film appearances, of which Evensong was arguably her finest" ; and Time Out found it "a touch more sophisticated than the usual run of homegrown '30s musicals, genre specialist Saville's film benefits no end from the commanding and courageous central performance."

References

External links

1934 films
1930s historical musical films
British historical musical films
Films directed by Victor Saville
Films about singers
Films about classical music and musicians
Films about opera
Films set in the 1900s
Films set in the 1910s
Cultural depictions of Nellie Melba
British black-and-white films
Films shot at Lime Grove Studios
Gainsborough Pictures films
1930s English-language films
1930s British films